WHZN (88.3, "Shine.FM") is a radio station licensed to New Whiteland, Indiana. Owned by Olivet Nazarene University, it broadcasts a worship music format serving the Indianapolis area. Its transmitter is located in Trafalgar, Indiana.

History
The station originally signed on under the ownership of Horizon Christian Fellowship of Indianapolis, under the branding 88.3 The Walk. It was granted Program Test Authority from the Federal Communications Commission (FCC) on June 15, 2009, and its license was granted on October 9, 2009. The station launched with a worship music format,

WHZN was sold to Olivet Nazarene University in 2011, after which it rebranded as part of its Shine.FM network.

References

External links
 
 
 
 

Mass media in Indianapolis
HZN